Ricky Benton Racing was an American professional stock car racing team that competed in the Monster Energy NASCAR Cup Series and the NASCAR Gander Outdoors Truck Series. The team was owned by Ricky Benton and last fielded the No. 92 Ford Fusion part-time in the Monster Energy NASCAR Cup Series for David Gilliland and Timothy Peters in 2018 and the No. 92 Ford F-150 part-time in the NASCAR Gander Outdoors Truck Series for Austin Theriault in 2019.

The team later essentially merged into the Truck Series operation of Front Row Motorsports in 2020 with their No. 38 Ford F-150 driven full-time by Todd Gilliland and starting in 2022, driven full-time by Zane Smith with Gilliland's move to the NASCAR Cup Series in 2022.

Monster Energy Cup Series

Car No. 92 history
On January 17, 2018, RBR Enterprises announced that they would be fielding the No. 92 Carquest Auto Parts / BTS Ford Fusion in the 2018 Daytona 500 with David Gilliland.

At Talladega in April, Timothy Peters, who had recently driven for RBR in the Truck Series, made his Cup Series debut. Peters drove the Advance Auto Parts / BB&T Ford Fusion. Peters returned in the 92 at Daytona for the Coke Zero Sugar 400, however he failed to qualify.

Camping World Truck Series

Truck No. 92 history

Beginning in 2010, the team began fielding the No. 92 Chevy Silverado for Dennis Setzer. The team's first race at Nashville yielded a 26th-place finish. Setzer would drive the truck in 9 races, with a best finish of 12th at Indianapolis Raceway Park and Bristol Motor Speedway. For the 2011 season, the team hired Clay Rogers as the driver. Rogers and RBR would finish 3rd in their debut together, and under NASCAR's new points system beginning that season, Rogers would be the points leader. The team then decide to expand their schedule from what they had previously planned. They would make it through the first 11 races of the season, before scaling back to a partial schedule. 2012 would prove to be a slow season as David Reutimann would miss the opening race at Daytona. After 3 races, Reutimann was replaced by Chad McCumbee, who would also be released after 3 starts. Scott Riggs was then hired to drive the 92 at the second Martinsville race, where he finished an impressive 5th. Riggs would return in 2013, along with Matt McCall and Clay Rogers. Riggs would get a 9th at Martinsville. For 2014, a rotation of drivers would run the truck, including Ross Chastain, Riggs, Corey Lajoie and Austin Hill, as well as a switch from Chevy to Ford. Corey Lajoie would collect the team's only top 10 of 2014. David Gilliland would take the truck over in 2015, where he would collect two top 10's. In 2016, Parker Kligerman would move to the truck. At Daytona, Kligerman and team finished 3rd, tying the team's best result. He would have 3 consecutive top 10's in the first 3 races. Once again, it looked as if the team would have a chance at attempting the full schedule. However, after the first 8 races, the team would once again be reduced to a partial schedule. Later in the season, Cole Whitt and Grant Enfinger would drive with the team. Whitt would score a 12th, while Enfinger would score a 23rd. In 2017, the team fielded the No. 92 truck part time for Regan Smith. Smith collected 2 top 10's. The team returned part-time again in 2018 with Timothy Peters for 3 races. At the first Martinsville race, they finished 7th, but would fail to qualify for Charlotte and Bristol. In 2019, they hired Austin Theriault for 8 races. They failed to qualify for Daytona by mere milliseconds, but made the field at the first Martinsville race, finishing 22nd. They attempted the North Carolina Education Lottery 200 at Charlotte, but failed to qualify. They also attempted Bristol with Peters but didn't qualify.

Benton did not field a truck in 2020 as he instead partnered with Front Row Motorsports, which included bringing RBR sponsor Black's Tire to FRM's No. 38 driven by Todd Gilliland.

ARCA Racing Series

Car No. 22 history
In 2009, the team fielded this team for only one race with Drew Herring behind the wheel, finishing 16th at Rockingham.

Car No. 92 history
This team ran just two times, one with Drew Herring, and one with Brandon McReynolds.

References

External links
 

NASCAR teams
Auto racing teams established in 2009